Troubsko is a municipality and village in Brno-Country District in the South Moravian Region of the Czech Republic. It has about 2,300 inhabitants.

Etymology
According to a legend, in the early 11th, Prince Jaromír was to be assassinated by the rival Vršovci family in Velíz near Kublov. At the last moment, Jaromír's guide Hovora blew his trumpet (in Czech troubil) so that companions from Prague were alerted and saved the prince. For sounding the call to rescue him, Jaromír granted Hovora a settlement which he called Troubsko.

However, the name of the village is most likely named after wooden pipes (trouby in Old Czech) that supplied water to citizens.

Geography
It is located in the Bobrava Highlands on the Troubský Stream.

History

The first written mention of Troubsko is from 1237 when Robert from Troubsko is cited as a witness in a charter of King Wenceslaus I. The ownership of the village at that time was fragmented to limit several owners. In 1317–1389 there was a feudal estate of the Olomouc bishopric. In 1349, Luder from the Dominican Order in Brno bought a part of Troubsko and donated it to the Herburk monastery. This part of the village was administratively separated from the remaining larger part for a long time. After the transfer of assets of Herburk monastery to a Jesuit college in 1578–1581, it became a part of the Řečkovice estate.

The greater part of Troubsko was divided into unequal shares that changed owners frequently, and during the 14th and 15th centuries were held by various noble families. Matyáš Munk from Ivančice bought the whole village and from 1573 until 1609 is cited as the only owner. In these years he had also began the construction of a castle in the site of a former fortress. Next owners of the estate were Karel Elder of Zierotin, Albrecht von Wallenstein or Jiří Rupert Hausperský.

Troubsko reached the greatest economic and cultural development in 1735–1806, during the rule of the Sekora of Sekenberg family. The family devoted themselves to the economy, expanded the number of artisans and supported fish farming and forestry.

In 1826 the manor was acquired by Leopold Hodák. At this time, a school and the railroad were constructed. The village was promoted to a market town in 1876, but later lost the title. In the early 20th century cultural and social development took place.

Transport
The D1 motorway goes through the municipality.

Sights
The Church of the Assumption of the Virgin Mary is the main sight. It was built in the Baroque style in 1746–1758 on the site of a former church from the 14th century.

References

External links

Villages in Brno-Country District